Curt Schneider may refer to:

 Kurt Schneider (1887–1967), German psychiatrist
 Curt T. Schneider (born 1943), American politician